This page is a chronology of the Motown singing group the Temptations. It lists the members of the group during all phases 
of the group's history. While the Temptations have frequently changed their lineup, the group has always employed a person for each of the following roles:

main lead singer (e.g., David Ruffin)
secondary lead/baritone singer (e.g., Paul Williams)
first tenor lead singer (e.g., Eddie Kendricks)
bass lead singer (e.g., Melvin Franklin)
background second tenor and baritone w/ occasional lead (since 1961 Otis Williams has always held and continues to hold this role)

During their live performances, the 1st tenor who almost exclusively performs in falsetto and secondary leads have always been as predominant on stage as the group's official main lead/front man. Also, the 1st tenor position is always considered equal to the main lead position on studio recordings as well; the secondary lead was elevated to almost the same status in the studio from 1968 to 1972 and from 1993 onward.

The background/occasional lead role was originally that of another secondary lead singer before 1961.

The group has performed as a quintet throughout its history, with six exceptions:

The Cavaliers' lineup (1955–57, 4 Members)
The Primes' lineup (1958–60, 4 Members, later 3)
April – May 1971 (4 Members, No 1st Tenor)
The 1982 reunion lineup (7 Members)
The later half of 1995, following the departure of Ray Davis (4 Members, No Bass)
October 2019 to June 2020 following the departure of Larry Braggs (4 members, Terry Weeks singing lead, no replacement tenor)

Since 1976, the name "the Temptations" has been a registered trademark definitively owned by Otis Williams and (the estate of) Melvin Franklin.

The Cavaliers

The Primes

Otis Williams & The Siberians/The El Domingoes

The Distants

The Elgins

The Temptations
Members of the classic lineup are in bold.

Timeline

References

The Temptations